Pontus Widerström (born May 19, 1994) is a Swedish professional ice hockey player who is currently playing for Färjestad BK of the Swedish Hockey League. He previously played with EV Zug of the National League (NL).

Widerström made his debut with Frölunda HC during the 2012 European Trophy.

Awards and honors

References

External links

1994 births
Living people
Färjestad BK players
Frölunda HC players
Karlskrona HK players
IK Oskarshamn players
Skellefteå AIK players
Swedish ice hockey centres
Ice hockey people from Gothenburg
EV Zug players